The Race Beat: The Press, the Civil Rights Struggle, and the Awakening of a Nation is a Pulitzer Prize-winning book written in 2006 by journalists Gene Roberts and Hank Klibanoff.  The book is about the Civil Rights Movement in the United States, specifically about the role of newspapers and television.  "Race Beat" refers to reporters whose beat reporting covered issues of race.

The book received the 2007 Pulitzer Prize for History.

It was the necessary reading for the University Interscholastic League's Social Studies Competition in 2019.

References 

2006 non-fiction books
21st-century history books
Books about African-American history
Pulitzer Prize for History-winning works
Alfred A. Knopf books
History of African-American civil rights
Civil rights movement